Mariya Yakovenko (born 6 January 1982 in Krasnodar) is a female javelin thrower from Russia. Her personal best throw is 62.23 metres, achieved in August 2007 in Tula.

She competed at the World Championships in 2005 and 2007 as well as the 2008 Olympic Games, but without reaching the final.

Vakovenko tested positive for Dehydrochloromethyltestosterone (Oral Turinabol) 19 February 2013 and was subsequently banned for two years, ending 7 August 2015.

International competitions

See also
List of doping cases in athletics

References 

 

1982 births
Living people
Russian female javelin throwers
Olympic female javelin throwers
Olympic athletes of Russia
Athletes (track and field) at the 2008 Summer Olympics
Competitors at the 2003 Summer Universiade
World Athletics Championships athletes for Russia
Russian Athletics Championships winners
Doping cases in athletics
Russian sportspeople in doping cases
Sportspeople from Krasnodar
21st-century Russian women